La Tosca (also known as Tosca) is a 1973 Italian comedy-drama film written and directed by Luigi Magni. It is loosely based on the drama with the same name by Victorien Sardou, reinterpreted in an ironic-grotesque style.

Plot 
Rome, 14 June 1800. Napoleon's army threatens to conquer Italy, including the Papal States. Rome is reeking with corruption, especially among the clergy, determined to retain their privileges based on the exploitation of the poor.

The fugitive patriot Cesare Angelotti, escaped from Castel Sant'Angelo, is sheltered by painter Mario Cavaradossi. Baron Scarpia, regent of the Pontifical Police, hunts him down by luring Floria Tosca, Cavaradossi's mistress, into thinking that her lover is cheating on her. The woman, trailed by Scarpia, heads for Cavaradossi's house, hoping to catch him in the act, but finds him in Angelotti's company. Realizing she's been deceived, Tosca tries her best to save her lover, but it is too late. Scarpia reaches the house and surprises Angelotti, who commits suicide rather than being taken in.

Scarpia then arrests the painter for high treason. Lusting after Tosca, the baron blackmails her: he will have the painter freed if she yields to his sexual advances. She accepts, whereupon he makes a show of ordering his minions to have the painter shot with blanks. The letter of safe conduct written, Scarpia is then stabbed by Tosca, who then bolts off to Castel Sant'Angelo to be reunited with her lover. However, Cavaradossi is executed for real, and Tosca, in despair, throws herself off the ramparts of the castle.

Life in Rome continues seemingly unchanged, with the clergy oblivious to the new times looming, and the changes about to overtake the world.

Cast 
Gigi Proietti: Mario Cavaradossi
Monica Vitti: Floria Tosca
Umberto Orsini: Cesare Angelotti
Vittorio Gassman: Baron Scarpia
Fiorenzo Fiorentini: Brigadier Spoletta
Gianni Bonagura: Brigadier Sciarrone
Aldo Fabrizi: Governor
 Marisa Fabbri: the Queen of Naples
Ninetto Davoli: Horseman

References

External links

1973 films
Italian comedy-drama films
Italian films based on plays
Films based on La Tosca
Films set in 1800
Films set in Rome
Films scored by Armando Trovajoli
1970s Italian films